Westley Howard Harvey (21 October 1877 – 1904) was an English footballer who played as a centre forward for Aston Villa, Burslem Port Vale and Manchester City in the Football League in the 1890s and early 1900s. He played in the Southern League for Watford, and was also on the books of Walsall Town Swifts, Small Heath, West Bromwich United, Burton United, Darlaston and Glentoran.

Career
Harvey was born in Aston, in what is now Birmingham, in 1877. He played for Walsall Town Swifts and Small Heath, before signing with Aston Villa in September 1896. He scored three goals in eleven games for Villa in the 1897–98 campaign. He joined Burslem Port Vale for a £50 transfer fee in June 1898. He scored 13 goals in 41 appearances in the 1898–99 campaign, helping the club to finish ninth in the Second Division. He scored a hat-trick past Chesterfield in a 4–0 win at Saltergate on 4 November 1899, and hit a total of 17 goals in 24 games in the 1899–1900 season to finish as the club's top scorer. This was despite the fact that he was sold on to Manchester City in January 1900 as Vale suffered financial difficulties. He scored once in five First Division games for City in 1899–1900, and played twice without scoring in the 1900–01 campaign. He spent two years with Southern League club Watford in between brief spells with West Bromwich United, Burton United, Darlaston and Glentoran. He was twice suspended by Watford for a "breach of training regulations", which forced his departure from the club. He died in Aston in 1904 at the age of 26.

Career statistics
Source:

References

1877 births
1904 deaths
Footballers from Birmingham, West Midlands
English footballers
Association football forwards
Walsall F.C. players
Birmingham City F.C. players
Aston Villa F.C. players
Port Vale F.C. players
Manchester City F.C. players
Burton United F.C. players
Watford F.C. players
Darlaston Town F.C. players
Glentoran F.C. players
English Football League players
Southern Football League players
Date of death missing